Mark Roy Manges (born January 10, 1956) is a former American football quarterback in the National Football League.

College career
After playing high school football at Fort Hill High School, Manges played college football for the Maryland Terrapins (1974–1977), appearing on the cover of Sports Illustrateds October 1976 issue. He was also named to the All-ACC first-team.

At the beginning of his senior year (1977), he was a Heisman Trophy contender. Manges broke his hand in the third game of the season.

Professional career
Manges was a 4th round selection (105th overall pick) of the 1978 NFL Draft by the Los Angeles Rams. He played in one game in NFL with the St. Louis Cardinals. Manges also played one game with the Hamilton Tiger-Cats of the Canadian Football League in 1979.

Personal life
Manges now serves as a member of the Fort Hill High School Scholarship Fund Board of Directors.

References

External links 
 

1956 births
Living people
Sportspeople from Cumberland, Maryland
Players of American football from Maryland
American football quarterbacks
Maryland Terrapins football players
St. Louis Cardinals (football) players